Silverado is a 1985 American Western film produced and directed by Lawrence Kasdan, and written by Kasdan and his brother Mark. It stars Kevin Kline, Scott Glenn, Danny Glover and Kevin Costner.  The supporting cast features Brian Dennehy, Rosanna Arquette, John Cleese, Jeff Goldblum, Lynne Whitfield, and Linda Hunt.

The film was produced by Columbia Pictures and Delphi III Productions, and distributed to theatres by Columbia, and by Sony Pictures Home Entertainment for home media. The original soundtrack, with a score composed by Bruce Broughton, was released by Geffen Records. On November 12, 2005, an expanded two-disc version of the score was released by the Intrada Records label.

Silverado premiered in the United States on July 10, 1985. Through an 11-week run, the film was shown at 1,190 theaters at its widest release, and grossed $32,192,570 at the box office. Generally met with positive critical reviews, it was nominated for Best Sound and Best Original Score at the 58th Academy Awards.

Plot 
A cowboy named Emmett is ambushed by three armed men while he sleeps in an isolated shack and kills them. On a journey towards the frontier town of Silverado, he detours to another town called Turley to meet his brother, Jake. Along the way, Emmett finds a half-naked man, Paden, lying in the desert after being robbed and left to die. Paden chooses to travel with Emmett to Turley.

Arriving in town, Paden notices the man who stole his horse and saddle and buys a cheap gun to kill him. Soldiers attempt to arrest Paden until he shows that his name was on the saddle. The story is backed up by Cobb, an old friend of Paden's, who also loans him money to buy new clothes. Cobb wants to give Paden a job in Silverado, but he declines. The men run into a homesteader named Hobart, who mistakes them for two men named Baxter and Hawley. The real Baxter and Hawley show up to guide Hobart and his fellow settlers to Silverado. Later at a nearby saloon, Emmett and Paden witness a black cowboy, Mal, being harassed by several men and the racist saloon owner. Mal beats the men until Sheriff John Langston shows up and orders him to leave town.

Paden and Emmett are questioned by Langston and learn that Jake is set to be hanged for murder. Paden learns Emmett intends to break his brother out of jail and decides to leave. That night, Paden kills another man to get back his hat and guns, and Langston throws him in jail along with Jake. The next morning, Emmett sets fire to the town gallows while Jake and Paden break out of jail. The three men escape, pursued by Langston and his posse. Mal ambushes them, revealing himself to be a crack shot, and the lawmen abandon their pursuit. Mal reveals he is also headed to Silverado to visit his elderly parents after quitting his job as a butcher in Chicago.

The four soon encounter Hobart's wagon train. He reveals that Baxter and Hawley betrayed them and ran off with their money box. Jake stays behind while the others, accompanied by a man named Conrad, retrieve the money from a gang of outlaws; Conrad is killed by a sharpshooter. With the money returned, Mal parts ways and leaves them while Emmett and Jake reunite with their sister and her family. It's revealed that Emmett spent five years in prison for killing a rancher named McKendrick after their families feuded over land rights. At the same time, Mal discovers his father, Ezra, living destitute in the hills and his ranch burned down; McKendrick's son Ethan seized their land and Mal's mother died of sickness. In town, Paden visits the saloon and meets the manager, Stella. Cobb, who turns out to be the owner, hires him as the new pit boss after revealing that he is also Silverado's sheriff.

Emmett discovers that Ethan hired the gunmen who tried to murder him. Mal also learns his sister Rae is now the mistress of notorious gambler Calvin "Slick" Stanhope. Stanhope betrays Mal, who gets beaten by Cobb's deputies and put in jail. McKendrick's men murder Ezra, assault Emmett, burn his brother-in-law's land office, and kidnap Jake and Emmett's young nephew Augie. Stella, who knows Cobb is in Ethan's pocket, reveals to Paden that she despises what the two men have done to Silverado and urges him to make things right. Rae breaks her brother out but gets wounded in the process. The four men attack Ethan's ranch, kill most of his men, and rescue Jake and Augie while Ethan flees back to town. The group splits up: Jake outsmarts and kills Cobb's right-hand man Tyree, Mal rescues Rae from Stanhope and stabs him to death with his own knife, Emmett deals with the remaining corrupt deputies and guides his horse to kick Ethan in the head, breaking his neck, and Paden faces off with Cobb in a duel, outdrawing and killing him.

After saying their goodbyes, Emmett and Jake are accompanied to the edge of town to say goodbye to their sister and her family before departing for California, their long-stated goal. Mal and his sister reconcile and decide to rebuild their family's homestead. Meanwhile, Paden has found his true calling as the new sheriff of Silverado.

Cast 

 Kevin Kline as Paden
 Scott Glenn as Emmett
 Kevin Costner as Jake
 Danny Glover as Malachi "Mal" Johnson
 Brian Dennehy as Sheriff Cobb
 Rosanna Arquette as Hannah
 John Cleese as Sheriff John Langston
 Jeff Goldblum as Calvin "Slick" Stanhope
 Linda Hunt as Stella
 Joe Seneca as Ezra Johnson
 Ray Baker as Ethan McKendrick
 Thomas Wilson Brown as August "Augie" Hollis
 Jeff Fahey as Tyree
 Lynn Whitfield as Rae Johnson
 Amanda Wyss as Phoebe
 Richard Jenkins as Kelly
 Brion James as Hobart (uncredited)
 James Gammon as Dawson
 Sheb Wooley as Cavalry Sergeant
 Earl Hindman as J.T. Hollis
 Pepe Serna as Scruffy

Production 
The film was shot primarily on location at the Cook Ranch in New Mexico. In 1984, Lawrence and Mark Kasdan and crew were out scouting a remote area of New Mexico by helicopter, hoping to find the most suitable place to build the town of Silverado. The location manager appeared at the property of local natives Bill and Marian Cook. At that time they wanted to build only two to three structures, offering Cook a "casual number" as a location fee. "There wasn't any great motivation for me one way or another, but I said okay. It just grew from that into a big budget movie and the Silverado set was built," Cook recalled.

In an interview with Trailer Addict, actor Scott Glenn related how casting profoundly influences directing. In reference to different actors working together, he mentioned how he "really liked" Kevin Costner, and how he thought Kevin was "easy and comfortable" to be around. He said, "there is real magic going on with that performance." Glenn spent his time kidding around with Costner addressing him by saying, "hey movie star!" during that earlier stage in his career.

Reception

Critical response 
Among mainstream critics in the U.S., the film received mostly positive reviews. Rotten Tomatoes gives the film a score of 78% based on reviews from 36 critics, with an average score of 6.8/10. The consensus reads, "Boasting rich detail and a well-told story, Silverado is a rare example of an '80s Hollywood Western done right." At Metacritic, which assigns a weighted average out of 100 to critics' reviews, the film received a score of 64% based on 14 reviews.

Critic Janet Maslin, writing in The New York Times, said of director Kasdan, "he creates the film's most satisfying moments by communicating his own sheer enjoyment in revitalizing scenes and images that are so well-loved." Impressed, she exclaimed, "Silverado is a sweeping, glorious-looking western that's at least a full generation removed from the classic films it brings to mind." Roger Ebert in the Chicago Sun-Times called it "sophisticated" while remarking, "This is a story, you will agree, that has been told before. What distinguishes Kasdan's telling of it is the style and energy he brings to the project." In the San Francisco Chronicle, Peter Stack wrote that the film "delivers elaborate gun-fighting scenes, legions of galloping horses, stampeding cattle, a box canyon, covered wagons, tons of creaking leather and even a High Noonish duel." He openly mused, "How it manages to run the gamut of cowboy movie elements without getting smart-alecky is intriguing." In a mixed review, Gene Siskel of the Chicago Tribune, said the film was "a completely successful physical attempt at reviving the western, but its script would need a complete rewrite for it to become more than just a small step in a full-scale western revival." Another ambivalent review came from Jay Carr of The Boston Globe. He noted that Silverado "plays like a big-budget regurgitation of old Westerns. What keeps it going is the generosity that flows between Kasdan and his actors. It's got benevolent energies, but not the more primal kind needed to renew the standard Western images and archetypes." In an entirely negative critique, film critic Jay Scott of The Globe and Mail said the all too familiar "manipulative Star Wars-style score is the only novelty on tap in Silverado, which has a plot too drearily complicated and arid to summarize". Left equally unimpressed was Dave Kehr of the Chicago Reader. Commenting on director Kasdan's style, he said his "considerable skills as a plot carpenter seem to desert him as soon as the story moves to the town of the title." As far as the supporting cast was concerned, he dryly noted, "none of them assumes enough authority to carry the moral and dramatic center of the film." Giving Silverado 4 out of 5 stars, author Ian Freer of Empire, thought the film was the "kind of picture that makes you want to play cowboys the moment it is over." He exclaimed, "Whereas many of the westerns from the ‘70s try a revisionist take on the genre, Silverado offers a wholehearted embracing of western traditions."

The staff at Variety reserved praise for the film stating that the real rewards of the picture lie in its "visuals" saying, "rarely has the West appeared so alive, yet unlike what one carries in his mind's eye. Ida Random's production design is thoroughly convincing in detail." Julie Salamon writing for The Wall Street Journal, voiced positive sentiment joyfully exclaiming that Silverado "looks great and moves fast. Mr. Kasdan has packed his action well against the fearsomely long, dusty stretches of Western plain." Describing some pitfalls, David Sterritt of The Christian Science Monitor said, "When pure storytelling takes over after an hour or so, the picture becomes less original and engaging." Sterritt however was quick to admit, "The cinematography by John Bailey is stunning," but he frustratingly noted that "Like the last movie Lawrence Kasdan gave us, The Big Chill, it's best when the carefully chosen cast throws itself into developing characters and building their relationships." Injecting some positive opinion, the staff at Total Film viewed Silverado as a creation of the "Kasdan brothers' ebullient love letter to the horse operas of their youth", while throwing in "every Western cliché imaginable. It's not as rousing as it thinks, despite the efforts of Bruce Broughton's strident score, but looks terrific - all big skies and wide-open spaces."

Richard Corliss of Time didn't find the picture to be compelling, stating how the film "sprays the buckshot of its four or five story lines across the screen with the abandon of a drunken galoot aiming at a barn door. Though the film interrupts its chases and shootouts to let some fine actors stare meaningfully or spit out a little sagebrush wisdom, it rarely allows them to build the camaraderie that an old cowhand like Gabby Hayes exuded with no sweat." He ultimately came to the conclusion that Silverado "proves it takes more than love of the western to make a good one. Maybe the dudes at K-Tell were a mite too slick for the job." Similarly, the staff at TV Guide described how "Lawrence Kasdan bloats the plot with dozens of side stories that, in painfully predictable detail, show how each of our heroes has a reason for being in Silverado and why they decide to stick their necks out. Though much of the running time is devoted to these expository passages, it's all very basic and shallow."

At the 58th Academy Awards, Silverado was nominated for Best Music (Original Score), and Best Sound (Donald O. Mitchell, Rick Kline, Kevin O'Connell and David M. Ronne). In 1986, the film received a nomination for the Artios Award in the category of Best Casting for a Feature Film (Drama) by the Casting Society of America.

Box office 
The film premiered in cinemas on July 9, 1985 in wide release throughout the United States. During its opening weekend, Silverado opened in 7th place, grossing $3,522,897 at 1,168 locations. The film Back to the Future came in first place during that weekend grossing $10,555,133. The film's revenue increased by 3% in its second week of release, earning $3,631,204. For that particular weekend, it moved up to 5th place screening in 1,190 theaters. Back to the Future remained in first place grossing $10,315,305 in box office revenue. During its final release week in theaters, Silverado opened in a distant 11th place with $741,840 in revenue. It went on to top out domestically at $32,192,570 in total ticket sales through an 11-week theatrical run. For 1985 as a whole, Silverado would cumulatively rank at a box office performance position of 28.

Accolades
The film is recognized by American Film Institute in these lists:
 2005: AFI's 100 Years of Film Scores – Nominated
 2008: AFI's 10 Top 10:
 Nominated Western Film

Home media 
The film was released on RCA CED videodisc format and VHS in December 1985 and on Criterion laserdisc in August 1991. It was rereleased on VHS video format on July 8, 1994.  A collector's edition VHS featuring a remastered recording was released on June 1, 1999.  The Region 1 widescreen edition was released on DVD in the United States on February 3, 2009.  Special features include filmographies, the making of Silverado, and subtitles in Chinese (Mandarin Traditional), English, Korean, Portuguese, Spanish, and Thai.  Additionally, a two-disc Special Edition DVD was also released by Sony Pictures Home Entertainment on April 5, 2005.  Special features included A Return to Silverado with Kevin Costner featurette, Along the Silverado Trail: A Western Historian's Commentary, Superbit presentation, "Top Western Shootouts" featurette, talent files, bonus previews, an exclusive 16-page movie scrapbook, and collectible Silverado playing cards.

Soundtrack 
The original motion picture soundtrack for Silverado was released by Geffen Records in 1985. In 1992 Intrada Records issued an expanded edition on compact disc; then on November 12, 2005, an expanded two-disc version was released by the Intrada Records music label. The score was composed and conducted by Bruce Broughton and mixed by Donald O. Mitchell. Gene Feldman and Erma Levin edited the music.

References

Further reading

External links
 
 
 
 
 
 
 

1985 films
1985 Western (genre) films
American Western (genre) films
American films about revenge
Films set in the 1880s
Films shot in New Mexico
Films directed by Lawrence Kasdan
Columbia Pictures films
1980s English-language films
Films scored by Bruce Broughton
1980s American films